Mauri Ryömä (30 October 1911, Helsinki – 28 November 1958) was a Finnish physician and politician.

Biography 
He was a member of the Parliament of Finland, representing the Social Democratic Party of Finland (SDP) from 1936 to 1937 and the Finnish People's Democratic League (SKDL) from 1945 until his death in 1958. He was imprisoned for political reasons from 1940 to 1944. After he was freed in 1944 as a result of the Moscow Armistice of 19 September 1944, he joined the SKDL and the Communist Party of Finland (SKP). He was the son of Hannes Ryömä and he was married to Elvi Sinervo. He died in a car accident four months after having been reelected in the 1958 Finnish parliamentary election.

References

Sources 
 Hanski, Jari: Ryömä, Mauri. Kansallisbiografia-verkkojulkaisu. Studia Biographica 4. Helsinki: Suomalaisen Kirjallisuuden Seura, 1997. 

1911 births
1958 deaths
Politicians from Helsinki
People from Uusimaa Province (Grand Duchy of Finland)
Social Democratic Party of Finland politicians
Communist Party of Finland politicians
Finnish People's Democratic League politicians
Members of the Parliament of Finland (1936–39)
Members of the Parliament of Finland (1945–48)
Members of the Parliament of Finland (1948–51)
Members of the Parliament of Finland (1951–54)
Members of the Parliament of Finland (1954–58)
Members of the Parliament of Finland (1958–62)
Finnish people of World War II
Prisoners and detainees of Finland
University of Helsinki alumni
Road incident deaths in Finland